Yorman José Rodríguez (born August 15, 1992) is a Venezuelan former professional baseball outfielder. He played in Major League Baseball (MLB) for the Cincinnati Reds for one season in 2014.

Professional career
The Cincinnati Reds signed Rodríguez, considered a five-tool player, as an international free agent during the summer of 2008 for a $2.5 million signing bonus. Rodríguez made his professional debut in 2009, and played in the Reds minor league system through the 2012 season, reaching as high as High-A with the Bakersfield Blaze. The Reds added Rodríguez to their 40-man roster after the 2012 season.

Rodriguez spent the entire 2013 season in the minors, splitting the season between the Double-A Pensacola Blue Wahoos and Bakersfield, hitting a cumulative .259/.324/.427 on the year. He spent the majority of 2014 in Pensacola, playing in 119 games before he was called up to the majors for the first time on September 2, 2014. On September 4, Rodriguez made his MLB debut against the Baltimore Orioles as the starting right fielder, going hitless in 3 at-bats. On September 14, Rodriguez notched his first major league hit off of Milwaukee Brewers reliever Rob Wooten. In 11 games for Cincinnati, Rodriguez gathered 6 hits in 29 plate appearances, also notching 2 RBI.

Rodriguez began the 2015 season in Triple-A with the Louisville Bats. On July 6, 2015, Rodriguez was recalled to the active roster, however he was optioned back down to Louisville on July 11 without making a major league appearance. A few days later he was placed on the disabled list with a left calf strain, and missed the remainder of the season because of the injury.

Rodriguez missed the beginning of the 2016 season with a hamstring injury, and on May 22, 2016, he was placed on the 60-day injured list as he continued to recover. He did not appear in a major league game in 2016, but appeared in 27 games for the High-A Daytona Tortugas as he rehabbed his injury. On October 28, 2016, Rodriguez was outrighted off of the 40-man roster. On November 7, 2016, Rodriguez elected free agency.

See also
 List of Major League Baseball players from Venezuela

References

External links

1992 births
Living people
Bakersfield Blaze players
Billings Mustangs players
Bravos de Margarita players
Cincinnati Reds players
Dayton Dragons players
Glendale Desert Dogs players
Gulf Coast Reds players
Louisville Bats players
Major League Baseball outfielders
Major League Baseball players from Venezuela
Pensacola Blue Wahoos players
Venezuelan expatriate baseball players in the United States